Christine Black is a politician in Montreal, Quebec, Canada. She has served as borough mayor of Montréal-Nord and as a member of Montreal City Council since winning a by-election in April 2016. Black is a member of Ensemble Montréal.

Early career
Originally from Montreal's South Shore area, Black moved to Montréal-Nord at age twenty to work for the Centre des jeunes l'Escale (English: L'Escale Youth Centre). She became the organization's director in 2006 and held this position until the time of her election to public office.

In 2008, she became a spokesperson for the Mouvement Solidarité Montréal-Nord, a group that formed following the shooting death of Fredy Villanueva by a police officer. She argued in favour of community policing during this period and was quoted as saying, "Part of the problem is you have police officers who aren't known around here coming in and making arrests, harassing people, and then leaving. It's important to have a police presence here, but they also need to understand the flavour of the neighbourhood and the benefits of dialogue and prevention." She also noted that part of her centre's mandate was to provide basketball, soccer, singing, and dancing programs for at-risk youth in the community.

Black's party biography indicates that she has a certificate in social work from the Cégep du Vieux-Montréal (2001) and a Bachelor of Science degree from the Université de Montréal (2010), and that she is working toward the completion of a  Master's Degree in Public Administration from the School of Public Administration, with a focus on health services and social services.

Borough mayor and city councillor
Black was selected by Montreal mayor Denis Coderre to run as his party's candidate in a 2016 by-election for borough mayor in Montréal-Nord. She was 34 years old at the time of the election, and her campaign was focused on issues of economic renewal and lowering the poverty rate. The borough is considered a strong area of support for Coderre's party, and Black was elected without difficulty.

By virtue of serving as borough mayor, Black is automatically a member of the Montreal City Council and the Montréal-Nord borough council.

Electoral record

References

Living people
Montreal city councillors
People from Montréal-Nord
21st-century Canadian politicians
Women municipal councillors in Canada
Women mayors of places in Quebec
Mayors of places in Quebec
Year of birth missing (living people)
21st-century Canadian women politicians